The Goiânia accident  was a radioactive contamination accident that occurred on September 13, 1987, in Goiânia, Goiás, Brazil, after an unsecured radiotherapy source was stolen from an abandoned hospital site in the city. It was subsequently handled by many people, resulting in four deaths. About 112,000 people were examined for radioactive contamination and 249 of them were found to have been contaminated.

In the consequent cleanup operation, topsoil had to be removed from several sites, and several houses were demolished. All the objects from within those houses, including personal possessions, were seized and incinerated. Time magazine has identified the accident as one of the world's "worst nuclear disasters" and the International Atomic Energy Agency (IAEA) called it "one of the world's worst radiological incidents".

Description of the source 
The source was positioned in a container of the wheel type, where the wheel turns inside the casing to move the source between the storage and irradiation positions.

The activity of the source was 74 terabecquerels (TBq) in 1971. The International Atomic Energy Agency (IAEA) describes the container as an "international standard capsule". It was 51 millimeters (2 inches) in diameter and 48 mm (1.8 inches) long. The specific activity of the active solid was about 814 TBq·kg−1 of caesium-137, an isotope whose half life is 30 years. The dose rate at one meter from the source was 4.56 grays per hour (456 rad·h−1). While the serial number of the device was unknown, thus hindering definitive identification, the device was thought to have been made in the U.S. at Oak Ridge National Laboratory and was used as a radiation source for radiation therapy at the Goiânia hospital.

The IAEA states that the source contained  when it was taken and that about 44 TBq (1200 Ci, 87%) of contamination had been recovered during the cleanup operation.

Events

Hospital abandonment 
When IGR moved to its new premises in 1985, it left behind a caesium-137-based teletherapy unit that had been purchased in 1977. The fate of the abandoned site was disputed in court between IGR and the Society of Saint Vincent de Paul, then owner of the premises. On September 11, 1986, the Court of Goiás stated it had knowledge of the abandoned radioactive material in the building.

Four months before the theft, on May 4, 1987, Saura Taniguti, then director of Ipasgo, the institute of insurance for civil servants, used police force to prevent one of the owners of IGR, Carlos Figueiredo Bezerril, from removing the radioactive material that had been left behind. Figueiredo then warned the president of Ipasgo, Lício Teixeira Borges, that he should take responsibility "for what would happen with the caesium bomb". The Court of Goiás posted a security guard to protect the site. Meanwhile, the owners of IGR wrote several letters to the National Nuclear Energy Commission (CNEN), warning them about the danger of keeping a teletherapy unit at an abandoned site, but they could not remove the equipment by themselves once a court order prevented them from doing so.

Theft of the source 
On September 13, 1987, the guard who was tasked with protecting the site did not show up for work. Taking advantage of the absence of the guard, burglars Roberto dos Santos Alves and Wagner Mota Pereira illegally entered the partially demolished IGR site. They partially disassembled the teletherapy unit and placed the source assembly – which they thought might have some scrap value – in a wheelbarrow, taking it to Alves's home. There, they began dismantling the equipment. That same evening, they both began to vomit due to radiation sickness. Nevertheless, they continued in their efforts. The following day, Pereira began to experience diarrhea and dizziness, and his left hand began to swell. He soon developed a burn on his hand in the same size and shape as the aperture – he eventually underwent partial amputation of several fingers.

On September 15, Pereira visited a local clinic, where his symptoms were diagnosed as the result of something he had eaten; he was told to return home and rest. Alves, however, continued with his efforts to dismantle the equipment and eventually freed the caesium capsule from its protective rotating head. His prolonged exposure to the radioactive material led to his right forearm becoming ulcerated, requiring amputation on October 14.

Opening the capsule 
On September 16, Alves succeeded in puncturing the capsule's aperture window with a screwdriver, allowing him to see a deep blue light coming from the tiny opening he had created. He inserted the screwdriver and successfully scooped out some of the glowing substance. Thinking it was perhaps a type of gunpowder, he tried to light it, but the powder would not ignite. 

The exact mechanism by which the blue light was generated was not known at the time the IAEA report of the incident was written, though it was thought to be either ionized air glow, fluorescence, or Cherenkov radiation associated with the absorption of moisture by the source; a similar blue light was observed in 1988 at Oak Ridge National Laboratory in the United States during the disencapsulation of a 137Cs source.

Source is sold and dismantled 
On September 18, Alves sold the items to a nearby scrapyard. That night, Devair Alves Ferreira, the owner of the scrapyard, noticed the blue glow from the punctured capsule. Thinking the capsule's contents were valuable or even supernatural, he immediately brought it into his house. Over the next three days, he invited friends and family to view the strange glowing substance.

On September 21, at the scrapyard, one of Ferreira's friends (identified as "EF1" in the IAEA report) succeeded in freeing several rice-sized grains of the glowing material from the capsule using a screwdriver. Ferreira began to share some of them with various friends and family members. That same day, his wife, 37-year-old Maria Gabriela Ferreira, began to fall ill. On September 25, 1987, Devair Ferreira sold the scrap metal to a third scrapyard.

Ivo and his daughter 
The day before the sale to the third scrapyard, on September 24, Ivo, Devair's brother, successfully scraped some additional dust out of the source and took it to his house a short distance away. There he spread some of it on the concrete floor. His six-year-old daughter, Leide das Neves Ferreira, later ate an egg sandwich while sitting on this floor. She was also fascinated by the blue glow of the powder, applying it to her body and showing it off to her mother. Dust from the powder fell on the egg sandwich she was consuming; she eventually absorbed 1.0 GBq and received a total dose of 6.0 Gy, more than a fatal dose even with treatment.

Maria Gabriela Ferreira notifies authorities 
Maria Gabriela Ferreira had been the first to notice that many people around her had become severely ill at the same time. On September 28, 1987 – fifteen days after the item was found – she reclaimed the materials from the rival scrapyard and transported them to a hospital.

Source's radioactivity is detected 
In the morning of September 29, a visiting medical physicist used a scintillation counter to confirm the presence of radioactivity and persuaded the authorities to take immediate action. The city, state, and national governments were all aware of the incident by the end of the day.

Health outcomes 
News of the radiation incident was broadcast on local, national, and international media. Within days, nearly 130,000 people in Goiânia flooded local hospitals, concerned that they might have been exposed. Of those, 249 were indeed found to be contaminated – some with radioactive residue still on their skin – through the use of Geiger counters. Eventually, twenty people showed signs of radiation sickness and required treatment.

Fatalities 
Ages in years are given, with dosages listed in grays (Gy).

 Admilson Alves de Souza, aged 18 (5.3 Gy), was an employee of Devair Ferreira who worked on the radioactive source. He developed lung damage, internal bleeding, and heart damage, and died October 28, 1987.
 Leide das Neves Ferreira, aged 6 (6.0 Gy), was the daughter of Ivo Ferreira. When an international team arrived to treat her, she was discovered confined to an isolated room in the hospital because the staff were afraid to go near her. She gradually experienced swelling in the upper body, hair loss, kidney and lung damage, and internal bleeding. She died on October 23, 1987, of "septicemia and generalized infection" at the Marcilio Dias Navy Hospital, in Rio de Janeiro. She was buried in a common cemetery in Goiânia, in a special fiberglass coffin lined with lead to prevent the spread of radiation. Despite these measures, news of her impending burial caused a riot of more than 2,000 people in the cemetery on the day of her burial, all fearing that her corpse would poison the surrounding land. Rioters tried to prevent her burial by using stones and bricks to block the cemetery roadway. She was buried despite this interference. 
 Maria Gabriela Ferreira, aged 37 (5.7 Gy), wife of scrapyard owner Devair Ferreira, became sick about three days after coming into contact with the substance. Her condition worsened, and she developed hair loss and internal bleeding, especially of the limbs, eyes, and digestive tract. She suffered mental confusion, diarrhea, and acute renal insufficiency before also dying on October 23, 1987, the same day as her niece, of "septicemia and generalized infection", about a month after exposure.
 Israel Batista dos Santos, aged 22 (4.5 Gy), was also an employee of Devair Ferreira who worked on the radioactive source primarily to extract the lead. He developed serious respiratory and lymphatic complications, was eventually admitted to the hospital, and died six days later on October 27, 1987.

Devair Ferreira himself survived despite receiving 7 Gy of radiation. He died in 1994 of cirrhosis aggravated by depression and binge drinking. Ivo Ferreira died of emphysema in 2003.

Other individuals 
The outcomes for the 46 most contaminated people are shown in the bar chart below. Several people survived high doses of radiation. This is thought in some cases to be because the dose was fractionated. Given time, the body's repair mechanisms will reverse cell damage caused by radiation. If the dose is spread over a long time period, these mechanisms can mitigate the effects of radiation poisoning.

Other affected people 
Afterwards, about 112,000 people were examined for radioactive contamination; 249 were found to have significant levels of radioactive material in or on their body. Of this group, 129 people had internal contamination. The majority of the internally contaminated people only suffered small doses (less than a 1 in 400 risk of getting cancer as a result). A thousand people were identified as having suffered a dose which was greater than one year of background radiation; it is thought that 97% of these people had a dose of between 10 and 200 mSv (between 1 in 2,000 and 1 in 100 risk of developing cancer as a result).

In 2007, the Oswaldo Cruz Foundation determined that the rate of caesium-137 related diseases are the same in Goiânia accident survivors as they are in the population at large. Nevertheless, compensation is still distributed to survivors, who suffer radiation-related prejudices in everyday life.

Legal matters 
In light of the deaths caused, the three doctors who had owned and operated IGR were charged with criminal negligence. Because the accidents occurred before the promulgation of the Federal Constitution of 1988 and because the substance was acquired by the clinic and not by the individual owners, the court could not declare the owners of IGR liable. One of IGR's owners and the clinic's physicist were ordered to pay R$100,000 for the derelict condition of the building. The two thieves were not included as defendants in the public civil suit.

In 2000, CNEN was ordered by the 8th Federal Court of Goiás to pay compensation of R$1.3 million (near US$750,000) and to guarantee medical and psychological treatment for the direct and indirect victims of the accident and their descendants down to the third generation.

Cleanup

Objects and places 
Topsoil had to be removed from several sites, and several houses were demolished. All the objects from within those houses were removed and examined. Those that were found to be free of radioactivity were wrapped in plastic bags, while those that were contaminated were either decontaminated or disposed of as waste. In industry, the choice between decontaminating or disposing objects is based on only the economic value of the object and the ease of decontamination. In this case, the IAEA recognized that to reduce the psychological impact of the event, greater effort should have been taken to clean up items of personal value, such as jewelry and photographs. It is not clear from the IAEA report to what degree this was practised.

Means and methods 
After the houses were emptied, vacuum cleaners were used to remove dust, and plumbing was examined for radioactivity. Painted surfaces could be scraped, while floors were treated with acid and Prussian blue mixtures. Roofs were vacuumed and hosed, but two houses had to have their roofs removed. The waste from the cleanup was moved out of the city to a remote place for storage.

Potassium alum dissolved in hydrochloric acid was used on clay, concrete, soil, and roofs. Caesium has a high affinity for many clays. Organic solvents, followed by potassium alum dissolved in hydrochloric acid, were used to treat waxed/greased floors and tables. Sodium hydroxide solutions, also followed by dissolved potassium alum, were used to treat synthetic floors, machines and typewriters.

Prussian blue was used to internally decontaminate many people, although by the time it was applied, much of the radioactive material had already migrated from the bloodstream to the muscle tissue, greatly hampering its effectiveness. Urine from victims was treated with ion-exchange resin to compact the waste for ease of storage.

Recovery considerations 
The cleanup operation was much harder for this event than it could have been because the source was opened and the active material was water-soluble. A sealed source need only be picked up, placed in a lead container, and transported to the radioactive waste storage. In the recovery of lost sources, the IAEA recommends careful planning and using a crane or other device to place shielding (such as a pallet of bricks or a concrete block) near the source to protect recovery workers.

Contamination locations 

The Goiânia accident spread significant radioactive contamination throughout the Aeroporto, Central, and Ferroviários districts. Even after the cleanup, 7 TBq of radioactivity remained unaccounted for.

Some of the key contamination sites:
 Goiânia's Instituto Goiano de Radioterapia (IGR), despite being the origin of the radiation source, suffered no actual exposure or breach of radioactive contents. IGR moved its clinic to another location in the city, with the previous site having been replaced around 2000 with the modernized Centro de Convenções de Goiânia (Goiânia Convention Center).
 Roberto dos Santos' house on Rua 57. The radioactive source was here for about six days, and it was partially broken into.
 Devair Ferreira's scrapyard, on Rua 15A ("Junkyard I") in the Aeroporto section of the city, had possession of the items for seven days. The caesium container was entirely dismantled, spreading significant contamination. Extreme radiation levels of up to 1.5 Sv·h−1 were found by investigators in the middle of the scrapyard.
 Ivo Ferreira's house ("Junkyard II"), at 1F Rua 6. Some of the contamination was spread about the house, fatally poisoning Leide das Neves Ferreira and Maria Gabriela Ferreira. The adjacent junkyard scavenged the remainder of parts from the IGR facility. The premises were heavily contaminated, with radiation dose rates up to 2 Sv·h−1.
 "Junkyard III". This junkyard had possession of the items for three days until they were sent away.
 Vigilância Sanitária. Here, the substance was quarantined, and an official cleanup response began.

Other contamination was also found in or on:
 Three buses
 42 houses
 fourteen cars
 five pigs
 50,000 rolls of toilet paper

Legacy

Disposal of the capsule
The original teletherapy capsule was seized by the Brazilian military as soon as it was discovered, and since then the empty capsule has been on display at the Escola de Instrução Especializada ("School of Specialized Instruction") in Rio de Janeiro as a memento to those who participated in the cleanup of the contaminated area.

Research 
In 1991, a group of researchers collected blood samples from highly exposed survivors of the incident. Subsequent analysis resulted in the publication of numerous scientific articles.

Media depictions 
A 1990 film, Césio 137 – O Pesadelo de Goiânia ("Caesium-137 – The Nightmare of Goiânia"), a dramatisation of the incident, was made by Roberto Pires. It won several awards at the 1990 Festival de Brasília.

A 1992 episode of Captain Planet and the Planeteers depicts a somewhat loosely-based version of this event in the episode "A Deadly Glow," albeit with a happier ending for all involved, and blaming the contamination of the town on an eco-villain. However, it did feature caesium-137 as the radioactive contaminant, as well as portrayed two young children unwittingly playing with it in a similar manner to Leide das Neves Ferreira, who, unlike the children in the cartoon, received a fatal dose.

Foundation 
The state government of Goiás established the Fundação Leide das Neves Ferreira in February 1988, both to study the extent of contamination of the population as a result of the incident and to render aid to those affected.

See also 

 List of civilian radiation accidents
 Ciudad Juárez cobalt-60 contamination incident, similar disaster in Mexico

References

External links 
 
 Detailed Report from the International Atomic Energy Agency, Vienna, 1988
 Similar accidents over the world (short overview)
 The Goiânia Radiation Incident

Health disasters in Brazil
Disasters in Brazil
1987 industrial disasters
1987 health disasters
1987 in Brazil
Radiation accidents and incidents
Radioactive waste
Waste disposal incidents
Caesium
Goiânia
Radioactively contaminated areas
1987 in the environment
September 1987 events in South America
INES Level 5 accidents
Civilian nuclear power accidents
1987 disasters in Brazil